Patrick Colucci (aka Christopher Cole; born May 5, 1949) is an American novelist and poet. His writings, largely biographical, are existential in nature and cover such topics such as spirituality, search for meaning, and conflicts between faith and reason. His novel The Closer's Song was written under the pseudonym Christopher Cole.

References

http://www.voicebase.com/autonotes/public_detail/49932/refine/woodstock/
http://www.bbc.co.uk/programmes/p0096hkp/
https://www.inquirer.com/news/woodstock-50th-anniversary-stories-memories-20190810.html

External links
Patrick Colucci interview on NBC

21st-century American novelists
1949 births
Living people
21st-century American poets
American male novelists
American male poets
20th-century American novelists
20th-century American male writers
21st-century American male writers
Archbishop Stepinac High School alumni